Augusto Pedro Berto (Bahía Blanca, 4 February 1889 – 29 April 1953) was an Argentine composer and bandoneón player who was the first composer to spread popular Argentine music in Europe. He is best known for his tango compositions.

Works

La payanca
The immensely popular "" made Berto's name. It is claimed to have been written in (1906) when Berto was only 17.

¿Dónde estás corazón?
His other signal success was :es:¿Dónde estás corazón? (tango) (1928). The words and music of ¿Dónde estás corazón? were not in fact written by Berto but was adapted into a tango from a song (1924) by :es:Luis Martínez Serrano. Berto's adaptation as a tango with lyrics by became a standard, being recorded first by Francisco Lomuto  1928, and Ignacio Corsini with guitars (1930).

Berto's lyrics begin: "I Yo la quería más que a mi vida. Más que a mi madre la amaba yo"

Other artists to record the tango include:

Juan Arvizu, 
Alfredo Sadel
Miguel Caló with singer Raúl Del Mar and recitation by :es:Héctor Gagliardi
 Alberto Castillo, 
 , with  Francisco Canaro 
Julio De Caro singing in French
Pedro and :es:Juan Lauga, 
Ada Falcón with the orchestra of Francisco Canaro, 
Teófilo Ibáñez with the orchestra of Roberto Firpo, 
:es:Armando Pontier with the voice of :es:Oscar Ferrari, 
:es:Agustín Irusta (artista)-Roberto Fugazot-Lucio Demare,
:es:Leo Marini, 
:es:Blanca Mooney with :es:Luis Stazo, 
Azucena Maizani, 
:es:Antonio Rodio with the voice of Alberto Serna   1944,
Opera singer Tito Schipa, 
:es:Mercedes Simone
Natalio Tursi
Roberto Ledesma,
Vicente Fernández
Darío Gómez
The Castilians   	1952
Caterina Valente	1963
Complesso "Gli Aratros"    	 
Laura Canales & Encanto   	  
Renacimiento '74   	1977
Rubén Vela y su Conjunto  	  
Jerry Ross, in English as "Where Is Your Love (Dónde Estás Corazón)"	1961

References

1889 births
1953 deaths